Gerard Paul Lavergne Matos (born 25 January 1999) is a Dominican professional footballer who plays as a midfielder for Liga Dominicana club Atlético Pantoja and the Dominican Republic national team.

Club career
On 4 March 2021, Lavergne joined FC Tucson in USL League One.

He made the switch to Canadian Premier League side York United on 3 June 2021. He made his debut for York on July 12. In December 2021 York announced they had declined Lavergne's contract option.

International career
Lavergne made his senior debut for Dominican Republic on 22 March 2018, being a second half substitute in a 4–0 friendly win against Turks and Caicos Islands.

Honours
Cibao
Copa Dominicana de Fútbol: 2015, 2016

References

External links

1995 births
Living people
Association football midfielders
Dominican Republic footballers
Sportspeople from Santo Domingo
Cibao FC players
CA San Cristóbal players
FC Tucson players
York United FC players
Liga Dominicana de Fútbol players
Dominican Republic under-20 international footballers
Dominican Republic international footballers
Dominican Republic expatriate footballers
Dominican Republic expatriate sportspeople in the United States
Expatriate soccer players in the United States
Dominican Republic expatriate sportspeople in Canada
Expatriate soccer players in Canada
Dominican Republic youth international footballers